Obelistes acutangulus is a species of leaf beetle from Ghana and the Democratic Republic of the Congo. It was first described by Julius Weise in 1895.

References 

Eumolpinae
Beetles of the Democratic Republic of the Congo
Taxa named by Julius Weise
Beetles described in 1895
Insects of West Africa